William Donald Friedman (March 21, 1930 – August 11, 2013) was an American businessman, talk-show host, and politician.

Born in Denver, Colorado, Friedman received his bachelor's degree from Wesleyan University and his master's degree from University of California, Berkeley and was a real estate developer and mobile home park operator. Friedman served in the Colorado House of Representatives from 1962 to 1976 as a Republican. Later he was a talk-show host on the Denver, Colorado area radio stations. On said radio stations he often took a controversial republican stance. He died in Englewood, Colorado on August 11, 2013.

Notes

1930 births
2013 deaths
Politicians from Denver
Wesleyan University alumni
University of California, Berkeley alumni
Businesspeople from Colorado
Republican Party members of the Colorado House of Representatives
American talk radio hosts
20th-century American businesspeople